Sumatra is an unincorporated community in far northwestern Rosebud County, Montana, United States.  It consists of a church and a post office, with respective houses, surrounded by open ranch land.

Sumatra was established in 1905 as a station stop, called Summit, on the Milwaukee Road. The town name was changed to Sumatra, after an Indonesian island, with the opening of the post office in 1910.

Notes

Geography of Rosebud County, Montana
Unincorporated communities in Montana